Canadian singer Peaches has released six studio albums, one remix album, one extended play, 30 singles (including 11 as a featured artist), four promotional singles, and 44 music videos. Before she gained fame as Peaches, Merrill Nisker released her debut studio album, Fancypants Hoodlum, under her own name in 1995. In 2000, Peaches released The Teaches of Peaches, her first album to break away from her avant-garde jazz and folk background.

Fatherfucker was released in 2003 and became Peaches' first charting album. It peaked at number five on the Dance/Electronic Albums chart, and reached numbers 35 and 33 on the Top Heatseekers and Independent Albums charts, respectively. In 2006, Peaches released Impeach My Bush, her first album to chart on the Billboard 200, peaking at number 168. Peaches' fifth album I Feel Cream was released in 2009 and charted in a total of six countries.

Albums

Studio albums

Remix albums

Extended plays

Singles

As lead artist

As featured artist

Promotional singles

Guest appearances

Remixes

Other credits

Music videos

Notes

References

External links
 
 
 
 

Discographies of Canadian artists
Electronic music discographies
Discography